Thomas Hassell (christened 21 December 1819) was an English amateur cricketer who played one match for Kent County Cricket Club in 1847. He was christened in Eynsford in Kent.

Hassell played for Gravesend Cricket Club in 1845 and 1846. He played for a Gentlemen of Kent side in May 1847 before making his only first-class appearance for Kent against Sussex in June 1847 at Tunbridge Wells. He died in New Zealand.

References

External links

1819 births
English cricketers
Kent cricketers
Year of death unknown
People from Eynsford